The 2014 Women's Hockey World Cup was the 13th edition of the Women's Hockey World Cup field hockey tournament. It was held from 31 May to 14 June 2014 at the Kyocera Stadion in The Hague, Netherlands. simultaneously with the men's tournament. It was the third time that the Netherlands hosted the Women's World Cup after 1986 and 1998.

The Netherlands won the tournament for a seventh time after defeating Australia 2–0 in the final. Defending champions Argentina won the third place match by defeating the United States 2–1.

Bidding
The host was announced on 11 November 2010 during the FIH Congress and Forum in Montreux, Switzerland after FIH received bids from The Hague and London.

Qualification
Each of the continental champions from five confederations and the host nation receive an automatic berth. In addition to the six highest placed teams at the Semifinals of the 2012–13 FIH Hockey World League not already qualified, the following twelve teams, shown with final pre-tournament rankings, competed in this tournament.

Squads

Umpires
17 umpires were appointed by the FIH for this tournament.

Claire Adenot (FRA)
Amy Baxter (USA)
Karen Bennett (NZL)
Frances Block (ENG)
Caroline Brunekreef (NED)
Laurine Delforge (BEL)
Elena Eskina (RUS)
Soledad Iparraguirre (ARG)
Michelle Joubert (RSA)
Kang Hyun-young (KOR)
Michelle Meister (GER)
Miao Lin (CHN)
Irene Presenqui (ARG)
Lisa Roach (AUS)
Chieko Soma (JPN)
Wendy Stewart (CAN)
Melissa Trivic (AUS)

Results
All times are Central European Summer Time (UTC+02:00)

First round

Pool A

Pool B

Fifth to twelfth place classification

Eleventh and twelfth place

Ninth and tenth place

Seventh and eighth place

Fifth and sixth place

First to fourth place classification

Semifinals

Third and fourth place

Final

Awards

Statistics

Final standings

Goalscorers
7 goals
 Maartje Paumen

6 goals
 Anna Flanagan

5 goals

 Kim Lammers
 Anita Punt
 Kelsey Kolojejchick

4 goals

 Silvina D'Elía
 Peng Yang

3 goals

 Luciana Aymar
 Carla Rebecchi
 Stephanie De Groof
 Kelly Jonker
 Krystal Forgesson
 Cheon Eun-bi
 Katie Reinprecht

2 goals

 Noel Barrionuevo
 Delfina Merino
 Jodie Kenny
 Jill Boon
 Emilie Sinia
 Liang Meiyu
 Kristina Hillmann
 Hannah Krüger
 Marie Mävers
 Akane Shibata
 Naomi van As
 Ellen Hoog
 Kayla Whitelock
 Dirkie Chamberlain
 Pietie Coetzee
 Shelley Russell
 Cheon Seul-ki
 Kim Jong-eun
 Park Mi-hyun
 Lauren Crandall
 Rachel Dawson
 Caroline Nichols
 Katie O'Donnell
 Kathleen Sharkey

1 goal

 Emily Hurtz
 Emily Smith
 Kellie White
 Barbara Nelen
 Alix Gerniers
 Manon Simons
 Wang Na
 Wang Mengyu
 Wu Mengrong
 Sophie Bray
 Alex Danson
 Susie Gilbert
 Hannah Macleod
 Kate Richardson-Walsh
 Susannah Townsend
 Nicola White
 Tina Bachmann
 Julia Müller
 Hazuki Nagai
 Yuri Nagai
 Ayaka Nishimura
 Shiho Sakai
 Shihori Oikawa
 Carlien Dirkse van den Heuvel
 Roos Drost
 Marloes Keetels
 Xan de Waard
 Sophie Cocks
 Katie Glynn
 Tarryn Bright
 Marsha Cox
 Sulette Damons
 Kelly Madsen
 Kathleen Taylor
 Han Hye-lyoung
 Kim Da-rae
 Kim Ok-ju
 Paige Selenski
 Michelle Vittese

References

External links

 
Women's Hockey World Cup
World Cup
International women's field hockey competitions hosted by the Netherlands
Hockey World Cup
Sports competitions in The Hague
21st century in The Hague
Hockey World Cup Women
Hockey World Cup Women